Vibhor Sogani (born ) is an Indian artist and product designer. Born in Jaipur, he has been living and working in New Delhi for the past 25 years. He has worked on several community art projects, the most notable of them being the Sprouts art installation near the AIIMS flyover in New Delhi.

Early life and education 
Vibhor Sogani was born in Jaipur, Rajasthan. After completing his schooling, he enrolled at the National Institute of Design in Ahmadabad, where he studied Industrial Design and graduated in 1992.

Career 
Sogani started his career with furniture division of Godrej Group in Mumbai designing the brand's executive-chair range in 1992 for almost a year.

He started his own company, ODD (Office of Design & Development), in 1993 after shifting from  Mumbai to Delhi. 

In August 2002, Sogani launched his Signature Brand of Lifestyle Accessories under the label Studio Vibhor Sogan, and had his first solo design show at India Habitat Centre, New Delhi. Until 2005, he was involved in his accessories line.

In 2006, Sogani designed a 2100 sq.m pavilion for DRDO (Defence Research and Development Organization) at the Defexpo with artist Ajoy David, which won the Best Exhibition Design Award.
In 2014, Vibhor Sogani has won the ‘Indian Icon of the Year’ award at Camera, Catwalk, Canvas Singapore. In 2015, Sogani exhibited ‘Mahatma in Me’, a set of stainless steel sculptures, at the Mahatma Mandir Convention Center in Gandhinagar. The sculptures were created as a tribute to Mahatma Gandhi. The exhibition then made its way to Zimbabwe and Tanzania in 2017, where it was hosted in several national galleries. Sogani is a member of the Indian Design Council since May 2017.

Artworks

Public art installations 
"Sprouts": a 40 feet high installation  in the heart of New Delhi. It is spread over 6 acres of greens in an area near Delhi's All India Institute of Medical Sciences. The installation symbolized a nascent nation, growing and ‘sprouting’ after 60 years of independence.

"Kalpavriksha – The Wish Fulfilling Tree": A 35 feet high light art installation, in Arvind Group's Uplands, Ahmedabad. Sited at a 100-feet roundabout, it is the largest public art installation in the state.

"Joy – Larger than life and simple in form, ‘Joy’ is an ode to celebrating all that is beautiful, joy giving and unadulterated in life.  Standing 30ft tall, crafted in mirror finished stainless steel spheres, this bouquet of balloons reflect the ever-changing environment around them as the passer by catches a glimpse of themselves in it.

Solo exhibitions 
Gujarat (2015): He exhibited for  the inauguration of "Mahatma Mandir" in Gujrat.

Australia (2016): His exhibition at Australia  for Gandhi Jayanti & International Day of Non-Violence by United Nations received international recognition.

Zimbabwe: In August 2017, his exhibition was held at the National Gallery of Zimbabwe in Harare which featured 12 artworks in stainless steel. The exhibition was supported by Government of India and the ICCR.

Tanzania: In December 2017, his exhibition traveled to the National Museum in Dar es Salaam of Tanzania. The exhibition was supported by  ICCR and the High Commission of India in Tanzania.

Trophy design
Sogani has designed several trophies over the years for national and international events, including: Prime Minister's Award for Excellence 2016, Nexa Excellence Trophy 2016, Prime Minister's award for Best Integrated Steel Plant, Elle Décor Design awards 2014, Samsung Cup (India- Pakistan Cricket Series in Pakistan −2004), Pepsi Cup (India –Pakistan Cricket Series 2005), The PHL Trophy (Premier Hockey League), The Hutch-Delhi Half Marathon, Allianz Cup (Pakistan vs. India Test Series 2006, ONGC-Nehru Football Cup (2007–08).

Awards and honours 
Sogani was named Best Lighting Designer of the year at the Elle Decor International Design Awards for 2008, 2011, and 2018.
 
He received the 2006 Best Exhibition Design award at the Defexpo, New Delhi; and the 2015  Platinum Winner, Grand Stand Awards at Acetech, Mumbai.

References 

1960s births
Living people
Artists from Jaipur